The Cabinet constitutes the executive branch and has general direction and control of the Government of The Bahamas. It is necessary for the Cabinet to comprise at least nine Ministers inclusive of the Prime Minister and Attorney General. All Ministers are Members of Parliament of either the House of Assembly or the Senate. The number of Ministers from the Senate is limited to three. In addition the Prime Minister and the Minister of Finance are required to be members of the House of Assembly. The functions of the Cabinet entail the final determination of government policy, control of government activities and coordination of government Ministries and Departments. The Cabinet meets at least once per week to consider various issues.

Cabinet Office 
The Cabinet Office falls under the portfolio of the Prime Minister, and functions as the secretariat to the Cabinet. The Secretary to the Cabinet is responsible for inter-ministerial coordination among the Cabinet and managing government and parliamentary proceedings. Other key responsibilities include administering the Office of the Prime Minister, the Government Printing Department, the National Emergency Management Agency, and the Department of Lands and Surveys as well as advising the Prime Minister on policy. The current Secretary of the Cabinet is Mrs. Nicole Campbell.

Cabinet Ministries
As of 22 September 2021 the Cabinet of Prime Minister Philip Davis consists of the following members:

Ministers of State
Cabinet Ministers may delegate certain daily operations of a department under their control to a Minister of State. The Cabinet Minister maintains sole accountability to Parliament for the faithful exercise of Department powers by a Minister of State. The Prime Minister may choose to assign a courtesy title that appropriately describes the duties assigned to a Minister of State. Such a courtesy title is distinct from the title of a Cabinet Minister, which is delegated by law through an Act of Parliament.

Currently designated Ministers of State 

 Minister of State for Grand Bahama in the Office of the Prime Minister, The Honourable Dr. Michael Darville, M.P. for the Pineridge Constituency, Grand Bahama  
 Minister of State for Disaster Preparedness, Recovery and Reconstruction in the Office of the Prime Minister, The Hon. Myles Kentworth LaRoda, M.P. for the Pinewood Constituency, New Providence.

References

Government of the Bahamas
Bahamas
Bahamas